Walnut High School is a public high school located at Walnut, California, among the San Jose Hills of the San Gabriel Valley in Southern California.

Ranked in the top 100 high schools in America by the Daily Beast Publication, Walnut High School is also located within the prestigious Walnut Valley Unified School District, which has also been ranked by numerous sources to be one of the top public school districts in all of Southern California. The school is a two-time National Blue Ribbon School (1992–93 and 1997–98), six-time California Distinguished school (1991, 1992, 1994, 1998, 2005 and 2009), and a California Gold Ribbon School (2017). Walnut High School has also offered the International Baccalaureate program since 1999.

Athletics
The Mustang Athletic teams compete in the Hacienda League of the CIF Southern Section offering 22 seasonal sports.

The Walnut High football team contends in Division 11 of CIF Southern Section.

In the aquatics program, the water polo team won a CIF championship, and both the water polo and swim teams won league titles.

The soccer program has won two CIFSS 1-A Championships (1990, 1992), including an undefeated season in 1992 (25-0-1).

Walnut's Girls' Golf Team won league titles in 2013, 2014, 2015, and 2016. The Walnut High School Girls Golf Team won their first CIF State title in 2016.
 
Walnut's National Champion Dance Team holds fifteen national titles, seven CADTD State titles, and were undefeated in the state of California from 2016-2019.

The Lady Mustangs (Girls Soccer Team) won the CIFss 2002, 2003, 2004

Walnut's Boys' Cross Country Team won CIF State Div 2 in 1987 and CIF Southern Section Div 2 in 1986 and 1987.

Walnut's Baseball Team won The CIF-SS Division 3 Championships in 2017.

Walnut's Girls' Wrestling Team won CIF-SS Masters 2019

Notable alumni
Paul Caligiuri, National Soccer Hall of Fame and 1990 FIFA World Cup soccer player.  Played professionally in Germany and for the Los Angeles Galaxy.
Gerardo Mejia, Ecuadorian rapper and singer, most famously known for his song, "Rico Suave"
Michael Cho, artist shot to death by La Habra police
Tod McBride, former NFL defensive back
Lance Parrish, former MLB catcher
Juliana Yendork, triple jumper
Gary Zimmerman, former NFL offensive lineman
Agassi Goantara, Indonesian Professional basketball player
Dwight Ramos, Filipino-American Professional basketball player

References

External links
 
 Walnut High School Athletics
 Walnut High School Student Newspaper

High schools in Los Angeles County, California
International Baccalaureate schools in California
Public high schools in California
Walnut, California
1968 establishments in California
Educational institutions established in 1968